Dixonius pawangkhananti is a species of lizard in the family Gekkonidae. The species is endemic to Thailand.

Etymology
The specific name, pawangkhananti, is in honor of Thai herpetologist Parinya Pawangkhanant.

Geographic range
D. pawangkhananti is found in Phetchaburi Province, peninsular Thailand.

Description

Reproduction
The mode of reproduction of D. pawangkhananti is unknown.

References

Further reading
Pauwels OSG, Chomngam N, Larsen H, Sumontha M (2020). "A new limestone-dwelling leaf-toed gecko (Gekkonidae: Dixonius) from coastal hills in Cha-am, peninsular Thailand". Zootaxa 4845 (1): 97–108. (Dixonius pawangkhananti, new species).

Dixonius
Reptiles described in 2020
Endemic fauna of Thailand
Reptiles of Thailand